() is a fiber manufacturing company based in Fukui, Fukui Prefecture, Japan. The company has two main offices: one in Tokyo and one in Fukui.

External links
 

Manufacturing companies established in 1923
Manufacturing companies of Japan
Companies based in Fukui Prefecture
Japanese companies established in 1923
Companies listed on the Tokyo Stock Exchange